John Franklin Spalding (August 25, 1828 – March 9, 1902) was a missionary bishop of the Episcopal Church in the United States. He served as Bishop of Colorado, first as missionary and later as diocesan, between 1873 and 1902.

Early life and education
Spalding was born in Belgrade, Maine on August 25, 1828. He attended Bowdoin College in the class of 1853, graduating from General Theological Seminary in the class of 1857. He was awarded a Doctor of Divinity by Trinity College in 1874.

Priest
Spalding was ordained deacon on July 8, 1857, and priest on July 14, 1858, by Bishop George Burgess of Maine. He spent some time as a missionary in Old Town, Maine and in 1959 became rector of St George's Church in Lee, Massachusetts. In 1860 he became assistant minister at Grace Church in Providence, Rhode Island and a year later also served in St John's Church in Providence, Rhode Island. Between 1862 and 1873 he served as rector of St Paul's Church in Erie, Pennsylvania.

Bishop
Spalding was elected Missionary Bishop of Colorado in 1873. He was consecrated on December 31, 1873, by Bishop Samuel A. McCoskry of Michigan together with Bishop Gregory T. Bedell of Ohio, Bishop Joseph C. Talbot of Indiana, Bishop Arthur Cleveland Coxe of Western New York and Bishop John Barrett Kerfoot of Pittsburgh. He was also given responsibility of the missionary districts of Wyoming and New Mexico. Between 1876 and 1880 he was also responsible for Arizona. Colorado was organized as a diocese and Spalding became its first diocesan bishop in 1887. He died on March 9, 1902, at the home of his son in Erie, Pennsylvania.

Works
Spalding wrote a number of books including A Devotional Manual, several tracts and numerous occasional sermons and addresses. He also published The Church and its Apostolic Ministry, a course of lectures delivered in St Mark's Church in Denver, Colorado in January 1887.

Family
Spalding married Lavinia Deborah Spencer and together ha three sons, including Franklin Spencer Spalding Bishop of Utah, and two daughters.

See also
 Franklin Spencer Spalding

References
 Obituary in The Living Church, March 15, 1902, p. 711.

1828 births
1902 deaths
People from Belgrade, Maine
Bowdoin College alumni
19th-century American Episcopalians
Episcopal bishops of Colorado
Episcopal bishops of Arizona
19th-century American clergy